Family Ties is the second solo studio album by American rapper Daddy X. It was released on January 31, 2006 via Suburban Noize Records. The twenty-one-track record featured guest appearances from Dirtball, Dogboy, Big B, Judge D, and Corporate Avenger.

Track listing

Personnel
Brad Xavier - main artist, producer, executive producer
Fabrice Henssens - photography
Kevin Zinger - executive producer
Mike Kumagai - producer, recording, mixing
Patrick "P-Nice" Shevelin - producer, recording, mixing

References

External links

2006 albums
Daddy X albums